Igor Hinić (born 4 December 1975) is a Croatian former professional water polo player, who was a member of the Croatia national team, that won the silver medal at the 1996 Summer Olympics in Atlanta, and the gold medal at the 2012 Summer Olympics in London.

Hinić played in five consecutive Summer Olympics for his native country from 1996 to 2012. He is, jointly with Greek Georgios Afroudakis and Hungarian Tamás Kásás, the tenth athlete to compete in water polo at five Olympics. He was also voted the Croatia national team's most valuable player.

He played for Primorje, Brescia, Mladost, Enka Istanbul, and was right handed. He won the Italian Championship 2003, and Turkish Championship in 2015.

Currently, Hinić is the coach in his hometown of Rijeka. He is 6'8" tall and weighs 243 lbs.

See also
 Croatia men's Olympic water polo team records and statistics
 List of athletes with the most appearances at Olympic Games
 List of players who have appeared in multiple men's Olympic water polo tournaments
 List of Olympic champions in men's water polo
 List of Olympic medalists in water polo (men)
 List of world champions in men's water polo
 List of World Aquatics Championships medalists in water polo

References

External links
 

1975 births
Living people
Sportspeople from Rijeka
Croatian male water polo players
Water polo centre forwards
Water polo players at the 1996 Summer Olympics
Water polo players at the 2000 Summer Olympics
Water polo players at the 2004 Summer Olympics
Water polo players at the 2008 Summer Olympics
Water polo players at the 2012 Summer Olympics
Medalists at the 1996 Summer Olympics
Medalists at the 2012 Summer Olympics
Olympic gold medalists for Croatia in water polo
Olympic silver medalists for Croatia in water polo
World Aquatics Championships medalists in water polo
European champions for Croatia
Croatian water polo coaches
Expatriate water polo players
Croatian expatriate sportspeople in Italy
Croatian expatriate sportspeople in Turkey